Molly McGuire is an American musician and visual artist based on New Orleans, Louisiana. 

Her canvases center around the theme of "Circus Banners of the Mind." In 2014, McGuire painted the complete line of circus banners for the 20th Century Fox television series: American Horror Story Freak Show. Working under the moniker “Magwire,” Molly's art is created from re-appropriated canvas drop cloths and custom tinted house paint salvaged from movie sets. The banners tend to reflect contemporary folklore and mythology presented as a carnival advertisement, or circus banner. 

Her work has been shown internationally and she is a yearly fixture in the art pavilions of the New Orleans Jazz and Heritage Festival. In 2012 she received a first-place award from the New Orleans Press Club for “Best Editorial Illustration,” which appeared on the cover of Offbeat Magazine's 50th Anniversary of the Preservation Jazz Hall Band.

Before becoming a full time visual artist, McGuire was a singer-songwriter and multi-instrumentalist.

Originally from Canada, McGuire relocated to New Orleans, where she met guitarist Dave Catching.  The two played together in the Gnarltones, a punk band.  McGuire then moved on to her own band, Rhudabega.

After Rhudabega broke up, McGuire relocated to Los Angeles in 2001.  There, she, Catching, drummer Brant Bjork and her brother, Brenndan McGuire recorded Demon Crossing in 2003 as Yellow #5; with Gene Trautman also contributing.
Next, McGuire formed The Spores, with guitarist Greg Biribauer and drummer Kenny Pierce.  They released Imagine the Future and, using McGuire's background as a visual artist, toured with an elaborate stage show. Though they toured as the opening act for the Eagles of Death Metal, they canceled due to infighting.
McGuire has also performed and/or recorded with Mark Lanegan, Martina Topley-Bird, Mondo Generator, Nick Oliveri, Queens of the Stone Age, and Frank Black.

Selected discography
Imagine the Future – The Spores
Doom Pop – The Spores
What Gives? – The Spores
Demon Crossing – Yellow #5
Songs for the Deaf – Queens of the Stone Age
A Drug Problem That Never Existed – Mondo Generator
III The EP – Mondo Generator
Dead Planet – Mondo Generator
Bubblegum – Mark Lanegan
Demolition Day – Nick Oliveri
Hello Radio: The Songs of They Might Be Giants – bass/vocals on "Road Movie to Berlin" with Frank Black

References

External links
Molly McGuire Contact Information for fanmail
Yellow #5 at Scat Records

Canadian women rock singers
Canadian singer-songwriters
Canadian emigrants to the United States
Living people
Year of birth missing (living people)
Mondo Generator members